Hossein Bolandakhtar (born 20 March 1976, Tehran)  is one of the best-known mountaineers and ski tourers in Iran. His professional career as a climber started at age 20 in central Alborz range. He has been working as a coach at the Mountaineering and Sport Climbing Federation of the Islamic Republic of Iran for several years, and is known to have trained several popular climbers in rock and ice climbing.

Mountain rescue
Being one of the most skilled rescuers in Alpine club and mountaineering and sport climbing federation of the IRI, He played a major role in the Parau cave rescue in 2002. Another important highlight of his career occurred in 2010, rescuing rock climbers in Alam-Kuh wall.

Climbing life
Hossein was one of the climbers who opened new routes on "Pol-e-khab", Alam-Kuh, Bisotun, "Akhlamad", "Sangesar-sol" and "Garmab-dasht". He successfully opened two other routes on the western and northern walls of Alam kouh called "Alpine" and "Homa-ye-saadat".

Being the technical coach of the Iranian team, Hossein reached the  "Lenin" mountain peak in 2007.

Other highlights of his climbing experiences include:
 Climbing the icefalls of the Alps in France in winter 2007 and 2008, along with other international teams.

References

1976 births
Sportspeople from Tehran
Iranian mountain climbers
Iranian rock climbers
Living people